Transmembrane protein 222 is a protein that in humans is encoded by the TMEM222 gene. One notable feature of the protein encoded by this gene is the presence of three predicted transmembrane domains. The TMEM222 protein is predicted to most likely localize to the secretory vesicles.

Gene Features

TMEM222 has a domain of unknown function (DUF778). Aliases of this gene include DKFZP564D0478, RP11-4K3__A.4, C1orf160, and MGC111002. Accession NM_032125.2, the longest coding sequence (1629 bp), encodes a protein of 208 amino acid residues (23230 Daltons), which is considered the consensus coding sequence (CCDS297.2). There are two isoforms of the protein encoded by this gene. They are similar except the second (Q9H0R3-2) is lacking the first 96 amino acid residues that are present in the first (Q9H0R3-1).

Gene Expression

ACEVIEW has labeled TMEM222 as highly expressed with 3.8 times more expression than the average gene in the database. There is expression evidence from 166 tissues including brain, lung, colon, kidney, and placenta.

Homology

Orthologs and distant homologs of the human TMEM222 have been identified throughout Eukaryota especially in plants and animals. No paralogs of this gene have been found in the human genome.

Distant Homolog

A distant homolog of TMEM222, RTH (RTE1-Homolog), is a homolog of RTE1 (Reversion-to-Ethylene Perception 1), which is known to induce conformational changes in ETR1 (Ethylene receptor 1) that result in negative regulation corresponding with loss of ethylene perception.

Protein Interactions

Evidence from yeast two-hybrid screening exists for two protein interactions with this gene. One is a serine protease (PRSS23) that has been identified to be involved in mouse ovulation and is excreted into the extracellular matrix. The other protein is an ab-hydrolase (HLA-B associated transcript 5)  that is integral to the membrane, and its corresponding gene is located in the genome near Tumor Necrosis Factor (TNF)-alpha and TNF-beta.

References

Further reading

Uncharacterized proteins